This is a list of borgs in Groningen (province).

See also 
 List of castles in the Netherlands
 List of stins in Friesland

Borgs in Groningen
 2